Autographa ampla, the large looper moth, raspberry looper, brown-patched looper or broken-banded Y, is a moth of the family Noctuidae. The species was first described by Francis Walker in 1858. It is found in North America from Newfoundland west to the Alaska panhandle, south to central California, Arizona and New Mexico in the west and North Carolina in the east.

The wingspan is 38–42 mm. Adults are on wing from June to August depending on the location. There is one generation per year.

The larvae feed on various trees and shrubs. They prefer willow and poplar, but have also been recorded on alder, birch, blueberry, Shepherdia canadensis, cherry, elder, raspberry, Amelanchier  species, stinging nettle and Viburnum  species

External links

Plusiini
Moths of North America
Moths described in 1858